MA Mottalib (1941-1994) was a Bangladesh Nationalist Party politician and the former member of parliament for Sylhet-18.

Career
Mottalib was elected to parliament from Sylhet-18 as a Bangladesh Nationalist Party candidate in 1979.

References

Bangladesh Nationalist Party politicians
1941 births
1994 deaths
2nd Jatiya Sangsad members